Bahadur Pentho is a village in Ganjam district in the south of Odisha, India, bordering Andhra Pradesh. It is located southeast of Berhampur and northeast of Ichchapuram. Alternative forms of the village's name include "Bahadurpeta" and "Bahadurpally".

Bahadur Pentho is a business center catering to surrounding villages. The major occupations are agriculture, trading, and self-employment. Crops are dependent on rain for irrigation.  There is a primary school and an Engineering college (Vignan). There is a water tank project of Gram Vikas Jala Porimala Jojona (35,000 liter capacity), around Bahadur Pentho which supplies every home with drinking water. Most residents are bilingual and speak both Odia and Telugu.

Demographics
300 meter east:west
150 meter north:south
Total Population: 2300
Male Population: 1100
Female Populati: 1200
Children Under 6 years of age: 400

Features
There is a primary school.
There is an engineering college (VITAM)
There is a gram panchayat office.
There is a watertank Gram Vikas project.
There is a Kalyan mandap.

Temples
Village Temple (ఉరామ్మోరు)

Trinath Mandir Temple
Pathalamma Temple
Hanuman Temple
Bhajagovindam Temple

{
  "type": "FeatureCollection",
  "features": [
    {
      "type": "Feature",
      "properties": {},
      "geometry": {
        "type": "Polygon",
        "coordinates": [
          [
            [
              84.76207494735719,
              19.170500774649916
            ],
            [
              84.76207494735719,
              19.170500774649916
            ],
            [
              84.76949930191041,
              19.16989274105729
            ],
            [
              84.76949930191041,
              19.16989274105729
            ],
            [
              84.77044343948366,
              19.16624449239587
            ],
            [
              84.77044343948366,
              19.16624449239587
            ],
            [
              84.76786851882935,
              19.16401496735334
            ],
            [
              84.76786851882935,
              19.16401496735334
            ],
            [
              84.76233243942261,
              19.163974430255305
            ],
            [
              84.76233243942261,
              19.163974430255305
            ],
            [
              84.75950002670288,
              19.166122882716504
            ],
            [
              84.75950002670288,
              19.166122882716504
            ],
            [
              84.75984334945679,
              19.16973059838707
            ],
            [
              84.75984334945679,
              19.16973059838707
            ],
            [
              84.76177453994752,
              19.170500774649916
            ],
            [
              84.76207494735719,
              19.170500774649916
            ]
          ]
        ]
      }
    }
  ]
}

Festivals
Ugadi is celebrated as the Telugu New Year. People listen to Panchanga recitals by Pundits on the day of Ugadi. This process is called as Panchanga Shravanam which is an important aspect of the festival. Makara Sankranti is also a famous harvest festival which is celebrated across the Village. Every year festivals are "Pathalamma  yatra" & "Ammoru yatra" are celebrated with much funfair, around 5,000 people of the yatra. Every 5 years Bhajagovinda yatra is celebrated with "Hari Namam" prayer 24 hours per day for 5 days. Around 10,000 people gather for daily 5 days of the yatra. Just like in other parts of the country, many other festivals include – Dasara, Vinayaka Chaviti, Deepavali, Vasantotsavam, Maha Shivaratri, etc.

Other temples
Rajamma (Suggu & Dharmala)
Gandhamma (Paili & Kotta)
Narsimha (Paili)
Rajamma (Pedini)
Narsimha (Dharmala)
Narsimha (Kota)

Ponds
Village Pond
Mangala Pond
Diguva Pond 
Bairodi Pond

Photos

References

External links

 

Villages in Ganjam district
Populated places established in 1936
1936 establishments in India